Francis Mellus (February 3, 1824 – September 14, 1864), brother of Henry Mellus, was a Los Angeles County Supervisor and a successful California business man.

Francis Mellus, born in Salem, Massachusetts, was a younger brother of Henry Mellus.

California
In 1839 he came to San Francisco in Mexican Alta California, and was employed as clerk by his brother Henry. As noted in his journal, he worked for a Mr. Thompson for at least 3 years. Reference Journal of Francis Mellus from June 11, 1838, to March 26, 1847.

Francis Mellus bought hides for this company along the coast of California, taking the goods by sailing ship to San Diego, where they were dried, and when a sufficient quantity was collected to fill a trading ship, usually took a couple of years' time, Mellus sent the goods to the East Coast.

Los Angeles
After 11 years of that work he came to Los Angeles, where he entered the general merchandise business with David W. Alexander, under the firm name of Alexander & Mellus.  Francis married Adelaida Johnson (the daughter of James (Santiago) Johnson and a sister of Henry Mellus’s wife Anita). James J. Mellus was the son of Francis Mellus.

Francis Mellus was elected to the Los Angeles Common Council, the governing body of the city, on May 1, 1854. He was chosen to be council president. Mellus resigned from the council on December 8, 1854.

Mellus was a member of the California State Assembly, representing 1st Assembly District, from 1855–56.  In 1858 he was elected to the Los Angeles County Board of Supervisors.

After the ending his partnership with Alexander in 1863, Francis Mellus was representative for the Wells Fargo Express Company until his death in 1864.

Francis Mellus' widow, Adelaida Mellus, married his partner Alexander in 1864.

References

American merchants
1824 births
1863 deaths
Los Angeles Common Council (1850–1889) members
19th-century American politicians
Mellus, Francis
Members of the California State Assembly
Politicians from Salem, Massachusetts
19th-century American businesspeople